DWAN (1206 AM) was a radio station owned and operated by the Intercontinental Broadcasting Corporation.

History
The station was established in 1973 by Banahaw Broadcasting Corporation, a company owned by the late Marcos crony Roberto Benedicto, on 1160 AM under the call letters DWWA. In November 1978, it transferred its frequency to 1206 AM, in response to the adoption of the 9 kHz spacing on AM radio stations in the Philippines under the Geneva Frequency Plan of 1975. In 1984, it changed its call letters to DWAN.

When BBC was dissolved after the 1986 EDSA Revolution, ownership of the station was transferred to the Intercontinental Broadcasting Corporation. By this time, it was located in Broadcast City. In 1996, DWAN returned to air, this time under the management of Bubby Dacer's Asia Pacific News and Features. Notable announcers included Rod Navarro, Cesar Chavez, the late John Susi and Pol Velasco. It went off the air in 2004.

In late 2007, the station returned to air, this time as MMDA Traffic Radio under the management of the Metropolitan Manila Development Authority. It transferred to its home in MMDA's Communications and Command Center in Makati. The station provided real-time traffic updates and public service reminders. Some of its programs were simulcast on MMDA TV..

On July 13, 2010, MMDA Traffic Radio went off the air as an effect of Typhoon Basyang (Conson). Both the station and MMDA TeleRadyo permanently ceased operations on August 17, 2010, in order to cost-cutting measures, which were costing the agency at least 1 million pesos every month.

References

See also
MMDA TV
Metropolitan Manila Development Authority

Defunct radio stations in Metro Manila
News and talk radio stations in the Philippines
Intercontinental Broadcasting Corporation
Radio stations established in 1973
Radio stations disestablished in 2010